(Examine me, God, and know my heart), 136 is a church cantata by Johann Sebastian Bach. Bach composed the cantata in 1723 in Leipzig to be used for the eighth Sunday after Trinity. He led the first performance on 18 July 1723.

The work is part of Bach's first annual cycle of cantatas. He began to compose cantatas for all occasions of the liturgical year when he took up office as Thomaskantor in May 1723. The cantata is structured in six movements: two choral movements at the beginning and end frame a sequence of alternating recitatives and arias. The opening movement is based on a verse from Psalm 139; the closing chorale on a stanza from Johann Heermann's hymn "". The cantata is scored for three vocal soloists (alto, tenor and bass), a four-part choir, corno, two oboes, strings and basso continuo.

History and words 

When Bach took up office as Thomaskantor (director of church music) in Leipzig in May 1723 on the first Sunday after Trinity, he began to compose cantatas for all occasions of the liturgical year. He wrote  for the Eighth Sunday after Trinity. The prescribed readings for the Sunday are from the Epistle to the Romans, "For as many as are led by the Spirit of God, they are the sons of God", and from the Gospel of Matthew, the warning of false prophets from the Sermon on the Mount. An unknown librettist wrote the text, closely related to the prescribed gospel. His text is the first in a group of ten cantatas following the same structure of biblical text – recitative – aria – recitative – aria – chorale. The ten cantatas were dedicated to the 8th to 14th and 21st to 22nd Sunday after Trinity and the second Sunday after Easter.

The closing chorale is the ninth stanza of Johann Heermann's hymn "" (1630) on the melody of "", which Bach used again in 1724 as the base for his chorale cantata .

The Bach scholar Alfred Dürr concludes from the autograph that only the middle section of the third movements and the chorale were composed in 1723 with certainty. The other parts may rely on a former unknown secular or church cantata, according to the conductor John Eliot Gardiner and the musicologist Tadeshi Isoyama.

Scoring and structure 

The cantata in six movements is scored for three vocal soloists (alto (A), tenor (T) and bass (B)), a four-part choir (SATB), corno (horn, Co), two oboes (Ob), two violins (Vl), viola (Va) and basso continuo (Bc). One oboe is marked "d'amore" (Oa) in the autograph kept by the Staatsbibliothek zu Berlin. Some scholars, including Dürr and Gardiner, believe that the second oboe part in the choral movements 1 and 6 should also be played by oboe d'amore. The title on the original parts reads: "Domin: 8 post Trinit: / Erforsche mich Gott, und erfahre mein ect. / â / 4 Voci / Corno / 2 Hautbois / 2 Violini / Viola / e / Continuo / di Sign: / J.S.Bach".

In the following table of the movements, the scoring and keys and time signatures are taken from Alfred Dürr, using the symbol for common time (4/4). The instruments are shown separately for winds and strings, while the continuo, playing throughout, is not shown.

Music

1 
The opening chorus expands on a psalm verse, "" (Examine me, God, and discover my heart). The music in the style of a Gigue expresses confidence facing the examination. In 1739 it was characterized by Johann Mattheson 1739 as "somewhat like the rapid arrow of a stream" (""). The movement is structure in two parts (A and A'), with choral fugues on the same themes, both presenting the complete text. An extended instrumental ritornello, dominated by the horn, is heard before, between and after the choral sections. The first fugue is preceded by a choral  (statement). Throughout the movement the two oboes never play independently but double the violins in the ritornelli and the soprano in the vocal sections. The virtuoso horn parts may have been intended for the exceptional Gottfried Reiche.

Bach used the same material as in this movement later in the "" of his Missa in A major.

2 
A secco recitative, "" (Alas, that the curse, which strikes the earth there), renders a contrasting change of mood. Bach interprets the curse of sin, and the hopeless situation of the humans and the threat of the Last Judgment in music full of dissonances.

3 
The alto aria, "" (A day will come), is accompanied by an oboe, an oboe d'amore according to Alfred Dürr and John Eliot Gardiner. The middle section, "" (For the wrath of His vengeance will annihilate), is certainly composed in 1723. The middle section is marked Adagio and in common time, contrasting to the first section, marked with Presto and with a 12/8 time signature.

4 
A secco recitative, "" (The heavens themselves are not pure), tends to an arioso in the last measures.

5 
The violins in unison accompany the duet of tenor and bass, "" (Indeed, the stains of sin cling to us). The voices sing sometimes in imitation, sometimes in homophony, in the style of duets Bach wrote at Köthen earlier in his career.

6 
The chorale, "" (Your blood, the noble juice), is expanded to five parts with a combination of the four-part chorus and an accompanying violin part, similar to the chorale of Erschallet, ihr Lieder, erklinget, ihr Saiten! BWV 172, written earlier by Bach for Pentecost 1714 in Weimar.

Recordings 
The entries to the following listing are taken from the selection on the Bach Cantatas Website. Instrumental groups playing period instruments in historically informed performances are marked green.

References

Sources 
 
 Erforsche mich, Gott, und erfahre mein Herz BWV 136; BC A 111 / Sacred cantata (8th Sunday after Trinity) Bach Digital
 BWV 136 Erforsche mich, Gott, und erfahre mein Herz English translation, University of Vermont
 Günther Zedler: Die erhaltenen Kirchenkantaten Johann Sebastian Bachs (in German)
 Luke Dahn: BWV 136.6 bach-chorales.com

Church cantatas by Johann Sebastian Bach
Psalm-related compositions by Johann Sebastian Bach
1723 compositions